Robert Fuchs (born 15 February 1975) is a Dutch former professional footballer who played as a midfielder.

Club career
Born in Eindhoven, Fuchs made his debut in professional football as part of the PSV Eindhoven squad in the 1993–94 season. He also played for De Graafschap before joining RKC Waalwijk. He retired in 2010, playing at amateur level for DESK from Kaatsheuvel.

International career
Fuchs is a former Netherlands U21 international, having gained 18 caps and scoring two goals between 1994 and 1998.

References

1975 births
Living people
Dutch footballers
Netherlands under-21 international footballers
PSV Eindhoven players
De Graafschap players
RKC Waalwijk players
Eredivisie players
Eerste Divisie players
Footballers from Eindhoven
Association football midfielders